Eneko Satrústegui Plano (born 25 September 1990) is a Spanish professional footballer who plays for Racing de Santander as a left-back.

Club career
Born in Pamplona, Navarre, Satrústegui's first professional club was local CD Izarra, to which he was loaned by neighbours CA Osasuna. He played with the team in the 2009–10 season, appearing regularly but being relegated from the Segunda División B.

Satrústegui returned to Osasuna in the summer of 2010, being assigned to the B side also in the third tier. On 6 November 2011 he made his La Liga debut, starting in a 7–1 away defeat against Real Madrid and being sent off in the match.

In his second appearance with the main squad, a 2–1 win at RCD Espanyol on 27 November 2011, Satrústegui also played from the start and was red-carded again, thus becoming the first player to be sent off in his first two games in the Spanish top flight. On 5 July of the following year, he was loaned to Segunda División's CD Numancia in a season-long deal.

Satrústegui returned to Osasuna in the 2013 off-season, appearing in only two Copa del Rey matches during the whole campaign, which ended in relegation. In August 2014 he rejected a contract offer from the club, and moved to Real Murcia of the third division the following month.

References

External links

1990 births
Living people
Spanish footballers
Footballers from Pamplona
Association football defenders
La Liga players
Segunda División players
Segunda División B players
Primera Federación players
CA Osasuna B players
CD Izarra footballers
CA Osasuna players
CD Numancia players
Real Murcia players
CD Ebro players
Lleida Esportiu footballers
CD Castellón footballers
Racing de Santander players